Shane David Halter (born November 8, 1969) is a former Major League Baseball utility player.

High school years
Halter attended Hooks High School in Hooks, Texas and was a letterman in football, basketball, baseball, track, and golf.  Halter played for the Norfolk Tides, a minor league baseball team located in Norfolk, Virginia.

Major League Baseball career
Halter played for the  Kansas City Royals (1997–1998), New York Mets (1999), Detroit Tigers (2000–2003), and Anaheim Angels (2004). Although he was essentially a backup player, he had notable power and he was adequate defensively in all infield and outfield positions.

On October 1, 2000, Halter showed his versatility by playing all nine positions in a single game, joining Bert Campaneris (Kansas City Athletics, September 8, 1965), César Tovar (Minnesota Twins, September 22, 1968), Scott Sheldon (Texas Rangers, September 6, 2000), and Andrew Romine (Detroit Tigers, September 30, 2017), in the select list of players to play all nine positions in a Major League game. Halter went 4 for 5 at the plate with 3 RBI, and also scored the game-winning run against the Minnesota Twins in the bottom of the ninth.

In his 644-game career, Halter batted .246, with 45 home runs and 197 runs batted in.

References

External links

1969 births
Living people
People from La Plata, Maryland
Kansas City Royals players
New York Mets players
Detroit Tigers players
Anaheim Angels players
Baseball players from Maryland
Major League Baseball infielders
Major League Baseball outfielders
Texas Longhorns baseball players
Charlotte Knights players
Seminole State Raiders baseball players